José Manuel García Herrero (4 April 1950 – 30 November 2014) was a Spanish professional footballer who played as a midfielder.

Football career
Born in Gijón, Asturias, García played for Sporting de Gijón and Racing de Santander during an 11-year professional career. He made his debut for the former in 1968, excelling against marker Ferran Olivella in a 2–0 home win against FC Barcelona for the Copa del Generalísimo (2–5 aggregate loss).

With Sporting, García spent three years in La Liga, sharing teams with namesake Ángel Herrero and thus being known as Herrero II. He retired from racing in 1978 at age 28 due to an ulna injury.

Death
Garcia died in his hometown on 30 November 2014, aged 64.

Honours
Sporting Gijón
Segunda División: 1969–70

References

External links

1950 births
2014 deaths
Spanish footballers
Footballers from Gijón
Association football midfielders
La Liga players
Segunda División players
Sporting de Gijón players
Racing de Santander players